Ange-François Fariau (13 October 1747 – 8 December 1810)  was a French poet and translator.

Fariau was born in Blois, the son of an advisor to the king.  He studied in the Jesuit college of Blois, and later at the Sainte-Barbe college in Paris. A protégé of Turgot, he went on to be a teacher in the Parisian school of rue Saint-Antoine, teaching grammar and later belles-lettres. He became well known for his translations of Ovid's works, especially Metamorphoses. Fariau also penned his own odes and poems. In 1810 he was elected to l'Académie française, but died in Paris three months later after a fall.

References
Biography from l'Académie française, in French
 Works by Fariau (WorldCat catalog)

1747 births
1810 deaths
Writers from Blois
French translators
French poets
Members of the Académie Française
French male poets
French male non-fiction writers
18th-century French translators